Christ and the Adulteress (German: Christus und die Ehebrecherin), also titled Christ and the Woman Taken in Adultery, or The Adulteress before Christ, is an oil painting by Titian, made about 1520, in the Kunsthistorisches Museum, Vienna.

Provenance 
Carlo Ridolfi mentions having seen this picture in the Venetian studio of Bartolomeo della Nave. It formed part of the art collection of the Duke of Hamilton from 1638 to 1649. It then entered the collection Archduke Leopold Wilhelm of Austria.

Copies

References

Sources 

 Ricketts, Charles (1910). Titian. London: Methuen & Co. Ltd. pp. 24, 35, 146, 176.
 "Christus und die Ehebrecherin". Kunsthistorisches Museum. Retrieved 27 October 2022.

Religious paintings by Titian
Paintings depicting Jesus